Süreyyabey Dam is a dam on the Çekerek River in Yozgat Province, Turkey. The development was backed by the Turkish State Hydraulic Works.

See also

List of dams and reservoirs in Turkey

References
DSI directory, State Hydraulic Works (Turkey), Retrieved December 16, 2009

Dams in Yozgat Province
Hydroelectric power stations in Turkey
Dams completed in 2004